Madcap Madge is a 1917 American silent comedy-drama film directed by Raymond B. West and starring Olive Thomas, Charles Gunn, Dorcas Matthews, Aggie Herring, and Jack Livingston. The film was released by Triangle Film Corporation on June 24, 1917.

Plot

Cast
Olive Thomas as Madge Flower
Charles Gunn as Earl Denham
Dorcas Matthews as Julia Flower
Aggie Herring as Mrs. Flower
Jack Livingston as Charles Lunkin
J. Barney Sherry as Earl of Larsdale
J. Frank Burke as Mr. Flower
Gertrude Claire as Letitia Jane Adams

Preservation
The print of Madcap Madge is held by the George Eastman Museum.

References

External links

1917 comedy-drama films
1910s English-language films
1917 films
American silent feature films
American black-and-white films
Triangle Film Corporation films
Films directed by Raymond B. West
1910s American films
Silent American comedy-drama films